Xue Qikun (born December 1963) is a Chinese physicist. He is a professor of Tsinghua University, Beijing. He has done much work in Condensed Matter Physics, especially on superconductors and topological insulators.  In 2013, Xue was the first to achieve the quantum anomalous Hall effect (QAHE), an unusual orderly motion of electrons in a conductor, in his laboratory at Tsinghua University.  Xue is a  member of the Chinese Academy of Sciences, vice president for research of Tsinghua University, and director of State Key Lab of Quantum Physics. In 2016, he was one of the first recipients of the new Chinese Future Science Award for experimental discovery of high-temperature superconductivity at material interfaces and the QAHE. This award has been described as "China's Nobel Prize".

Career 
Xue earned his PhD from the Institute of Physics, Chinese Academy of Sciences in 1994. From 1994 to 2000, he worked as a research associate at Institute for Materials Research, Tohoku University, Japan, and as a visiting assistant professor at the Physics Department of North Carolina State University, US. He became a professor at the Institute of Physics, Chinese Academy of Sciences, in 1999, and since 2005 has worked as a professor in the Physics Department of Tsinghua University. He is a partner investigator in Australia's ARC Centre of Excellence in Future Low-Energy Electronics Technologies. In 2020, he became the president of Southern University of Science and Technology (SUSTech).

Research and achievements
Xue pioneered high quality thin films of topological insulators and, in 2013, first achieved the quantum anomalous Hall effect (QAHE), at Tsinghua University. Nobel Laureate Chen-Ning Yang called this discovery "worthy of a Nobel Prize".
Xue's current research aims at preparation of low-dimensional structures exhibiting pronounced quantum phenomena, and understanding of growth dynamics and quantum mechanical effects on solid surfaces and in thin films, including:
 atomic-scale probing of surface electronic and magnetic properties by scanning tunneling microscopy and spectroscopy
 molecular beam epitaxial growth of novel quantum materials including low-dimensional and interface-related superconductivity and topological insulators
 quantum size effects in various low-dimensional structures
 study of electronic band structures of thin films using angle resolved photoemission spectroscopy (ARPES) and molecular beam epitaxy.
 exploration of novel quantum phenomena in materials with transport measurements
 development of new measurement techniques with high spatial and energy resolutions

Honors 
 2004, State Natural Science Second Class Award
 2005, member of the Chinese Academy of Sciences
 2010, TWAS Prize in Physics 
 2011, State Natural Science Second Class Award
 2011, Outstanding Scientific Research Team Award
 2014, Outstanding Scientist Award
 2016, Future Science Prize in physical science 
 2020, Fritz London Memorial Prize for low-temperature physics

Selected papers 
 Experimental Observation of the Quantum Anomalous Hall Effect in a Magnetic Topological Insulator
 Superconductivity in One-Atomic-Layer Metal Films Grown on Si(111)
 Superconductivity Modulated by Quantum Size Effects

References

1963 births
Living people
Educators from Shandong
Members of the Chinese Academy of Sciences
Quantum physicists
People from Linyi
Physicists from Shandong
Shandong University alumni
Academic staff of Tsinghua University
TWAS laureates